The Volta à cidade do Funchal (Tour of the city of Funchal in English) is an annual night road race of about 6 km which is celebrated around Saint Silvester's Day on December 31 in Funchal, Madeira since 1958, making it the oldest Saint Silvester Road Race in Portugal and one of the oldest in Europe.

It is based upon the Saint Silvester Marathon, a Brazilian race (held since 1925) which spawned numerous other New Year's Eve races. The Volta à cidade do Funchal is one of the city's foremost annual running events.

It has been organised by AARAM (Associação de Atletismo da Região Autónoma da Madeira) since 1997.

Past winners

References

External links
VOLTA À CIDADE DO FUNCHAL 

1958 establishments in Portugal
Recurring sporting events established in 1958
Sport in Madeira
Athletics competitions in Portugal
Tourist attractions in Funchal
December sporting events
Road running competitions
Winter events in Portugal